Abdasa is one of the 182 assembly constituency of Gujarat in India. It is a segment of Kachchh Lok Sabha constituency. It has been numbered as constituency number 1.

Areas under Vidhan Sabha Seat
This assembly seat represents the following segments

 Lakhpat Taluka
 Nakhatrana Taluka
 Abdasa Taluka

Members of the Legislative Assembly

Election results

2022

2020 by-election
A by-election was needed as the sitting MLA, Pradhyumansinh Jadeja, resigned from the assembly and Congress party. He won the by-election as the candidate for the BJP.

2017 Vidhan Sabha

2014 by-election

2012 Vidhan Sabha

2007 Vidhan Sabha

2002

1998

1995

1990

1985

1980

1975

1972

1967

1962

See also
 List of constituencies of the Gujarat Legislative Assembly
 Kachchh district

References

External links
 

Assembly constituencies of Gujarat
Politics of Kutch district